Rhinestone Cowboy is the twenty-eighth studio album by American country music musician Glen Campbell, released in July 1975 by Capitol Records. The album was recorded in Hollywood, and produced by Dennis Lambert and Brian Potter. Featuring the hit singles such as "Rhinestone Cowboy" and "Country Boy (You Got Your Feet in L.A.)", the album peaked at number 17 on the Billboard chart.

The album was re-issued on March 31, 2015. It contains a previously unreleased track, "Quits".  It also contained the Japan-only track "Coming Home" and the B-side "Record Collectors Dream".

Track listing

Side one
"Country Boy (You Got Your Feet in L.A.)" (Dennis Lambert, Brian Potter) – 3:08
"Comeback" (Lambert, Potter) – 3:23
"Count on Me" (Lambert, Potter) – 3:12
"I Miss You Tonight" (Lambert, Potter) – 3:07
"My Girl" (Smokey Robinson, Ronald White) – 3:14

Side two
"Rhinestone Cowboy" (Larry Weiss) – 3:15
"I'd Build a Bridge" (Mike Settle) – 3:43
"Pencils for Sale" (Johnny Cunningham) – 3:42
"Marie" (Randy Newman) – 3:34
"We're Over" (Barry Mann, Cynthia Weil) – 2:59

2015 bonus tracks
"Record Collector's Dream" (Bill C. Graham)
"Coming Home" (Bill Backer, Billy Davis, Rod McBrien) produced by Billy Davis; arranged by Dennis McCarthy
"Quits" (Danny O'Keefe)
"Country Boy (You Got Your Feet in L.A." remixed by Howard Willing
"Rhinestone Cowboy" remixed by Howard Willing and Julian Raymond

Personnel
Glen Campbell – vocals, acoustic guitar
Dean Parks – electric guitar
Ben Benay – electric guitar
Fred Tackett – acoustic guitar
Scott Edwards – bass guitar
Michael Omartian – keyboards
Dennis Lambert – keyboards, percussion
Ed Greene – drums
Dave Kemper – drums
Brian Potter – percussion
Gary Coleman – percussion
Paul Hubinon, Chuck Findley, Don Menza, Jerome Richardson, Tom Scott, George Bohanon, Lew McCreary, Dalton Smith - horns
Sid Sharp and the Boogie Symphony - strings
Ginger Baker, Julia Tillman Waters, Maxine Willard Waters - backing vocals

Production
Producers – Dennis Lambert, Brian Potter
Arranged and conducted by Thomas Sellers
Engineer – Joe Sidore
Mastered at Mastering Lab, Hollywood, CA
Production assistant – Marsha Lewis
Art/Photography – Roy Kohara
Embroidery – Helen Hamako Holden

Charts
Album – Billboard (United States)

Singles – Billboard (United States)

References

Glen Campbell albums
1975 albums
Capitol Records albums